Komsomolskaya Pravda is a daily Russian tabloid newspaper that was founded in 1925.

History and profile

During the Soviet era, Komsomolskaya Pravda was an all-union newspaper of the Soviet Union and an official organ of the Central Committee of the Komsomol. Established in accordance with a decision of the 13th Congress of the Russian Communist Party (b), it first appeared on 24 May 1925 in an edition of 31,000 copies.

Komsomolskaya Pravda began as the official organ of the Komsomol, the youth wing of the Communist Party of the Soviet Union (CPSU).  As such, it targeted the same 14 to 28 demographic as its parent organization, focusing initially on popular science and adventure articles while teaching the values of the CPSU.  During this period, it was twice awarded the Order of Red Banner of Labour (in 1950 and 1957), and was also the recipient of the Order of Lenin (in 1930), of the Order of the October Revolution (in 1975), and of the Order of the Patriotic War (in 1945).

The paper is owned by Media Partner, which in turn is owned by ESN Group, an energy company led by Grigory Berezkin, who has close links to Gazprom. In December 2000 the Norwegian media company A-Pressen bought 25 percent plus one share of the paper. It is published in tabloid format by "Izdatelsky Dom Komsomolskaya Pravda" (Komsomolskaya Pravda Publishing House).

Komsomolskaya Pravda reached its highest circulation in 1990 when it sold almost 22 million daily copies. In 2001 it was the ninth-top European newspaper with a circulation of 785,000 copies. It was the top-selling newspaper in Russia in 2006 with daily circulation ranging from 700,000 to 3.1 million copies. Its March 2008 circulation, certified by the NCS, was 660,000 copies and it was the most read paper in the country based on the findings by the TNS Gallup Media. In the same year the online version of the paper was also the most visited news website.

In January 2015 a front-page article in Komsomolskaya Pravda suggested that the United States had orchestrated the Charlie Hebdo shooting.

In May 2017, columnist Alisa Titko went viral for writing that the English city of Manchester was "full of fat people" and that she found the sight of same-sex love "disgusting".

In 2021, the tabloid published an article in which former Kontinental Hockey League coach Andrei Nazarov accused New York Rangers winger Artemi Panarin of sexually assaulting an 18-year old Latvian woman in Riga. The team released a statement condemning the allegations as a "fabrication" and “intimidation tactic” against Panarin after speaking out against “recent political events”, most notably expressing his support for Russian opposition leader Alexei Navalny, who was detained upon return to Russia from Germany.

Editors in chief of Komsomolskaya Pravda
The newspaper's editors in chief, in reverse chronological order, have been:
 From 2022 – Olesya Nosovad  
 1997–2022  – Vladimir Nikolayevich Sungorkin
 1995–1997 – Vladimir Petrovich Simonov
 1988–1995 – Vladislav Aleksandrovich Fronin
 1981–1988 – Gennadiy Nikolayevich Seleznyov
 1978–1980 – Valeriy Nikolayevich Ganichev
 1973–1978 – Lev Konstantinovich Korneshov
 1965–1973 – Boris Dmitriyevich Pankin
 1959–1965 – Yuriy Petrovich Voronov
 1957–1959 – Aleksey Ivanovich Adzhubey
 1950–1957 – Dmitriy Petrovich Goryunov
 1948–1950 – Anatoly Blatin
 1941–1948 – Boris Sergeyevich Burkov
 1937–1938 – Nikolay Aleksandrovich Mikhaylov
 1932–1937 – Vladimir Mikhaylovich Bubekin (1904–1937)
 1925–1928 – Taras Kostrov (Aleksandr Sergeyevich Martynovskiy)
 1925 – Aleksandr Nikolaevich Slepkov

Notable journalists
 Vsevolod Kukushkin, ice hockey and sports correspondent
 Dmitry Steshin, war reporter 
 Alexander Kots, war reporter
 Darya Aslamova, special correspondent and columnist
 Oleg Kashin, special correspondent

Related and similar publications
A "European" edition (Komsomolskaya Pravda v Evrope), aimed in particular at the Russian diaspora in Germany, as well as Russian-speaking tourists on the Croatian Adriatic coast, is distributed in several EU countries, while a special Baltic-region edition is available in Latvia, Estonia, and Finland.

A number of similar, but independently owned, newspapers can be found in other member or associate-member states of the Commonwealth of Independent States (CIS):
Belarus – Komsomolskaya Pravda v Belorusi 
Moldova – Komsomolskaya Pravda v Moldove 
Kazakhstan – Komsomolskaya Pravda v Kazakhstane 
Ukraine – Komsomolskaya Pravda v Ukraine (renamed KP in January 2016 in order to comply with Ukrainian decommunization laws)

See also
 Eastern Bloc media and propaganda
 Sovetsky Sport

Notes

External links

 
Baltic edition of the Komsomolskaya Pravda
Belarusian edition 
Ukrainian edition 
Moldovan edition 
Kazakh edition 
Kyrgyz edition 
Czech edition of the Komsomolskaya Pravda 
"Komsomolskaya Pravda" digital archives in "Newspapers on the web and beyond", the digital resource of the National Library of Russia

1925 establishments in the Soviet Union
Russian-language newspapers published in Russia
Newspapers published in Moldova
Newspapers published in Belarus
Newspapers published in the Soviet Union
Eastern Bloc mass media
Komsomol
Gazprom
Publications established in 1925
Communist newspapers